William Griebenow (born 15 April 1943) is an American former volleyball player who competed in the 1964 Summer Olympics.

References

1943 births
Living people
American men's volleyball players
Olympic volleyball players of the United States
Volleyball players at the 1964 Summer Olympics
People from Santa Monica, California